Erenice Alves Guerra ( or [eɾẽˈnjsj ˈawvjs ˈgɛʁɐ]; born 15 February 1959) was the 41st Chief of Staff of Brazil. She is best known for resigning from the post of Chief of Staff due to credible allegations of corruption and nepotism for which she was publicly reprimanded by the President's Public Ethics Committee. She was born in Brasília and is a law graduate, specialized in Health Law.

She was Chief of Staff of the Secretariat of Public Security of the Federal District Government and general manager of the Federal District Metro. She was also head of the legal department of the Brasília Society of Collective Transport (TCB).

At the federal administration level, she was manager of Eletronorte, Attorney General of the National School of Public Administration (ENAP), Legal Adviser of the Ministry of Mines and Energy (MME) and consultant of the United Nations Educational, Scientific and Cultural Organization (UNESCO) at the Ministry of Health. She also worked in the council of the Chamber of Deputies of Brazil.

Erenice was an advisor at Petrobras and the São Francisco Hydroelectric Company (CHESF). Currently she is member of the board of directors of the Brazilian Development Bank (BNDES).

From 2005 to 2010 she held the position of Executive Secretary of the Presidential Staff Office.

References

External links
 Erenice Alves Guerra - Biographical Data Office of the Chief of Staff of Brazil

1959 births
Living people
Government ministers of Brazil
Women government ministers of Brazil
People from Brasília
Chiefs of Staff of Brazil